Decade of Decadence 81–91 is the first compilation album by the American heavy metal band Mötley Crüe, released on October 19, 1991. It peaked at number 2 on the US Billboard 200 chart. It was the band's sixth album overall and the first of several greatest hits compilations.

Overview
Though it was intended to be the band's first compilation album, the content was unlike a standard compilation release. As well as six of the band's greatest hits, it featured three remixes ("Live Wire (Kick Ass '91 Remix)", "Piece of Your Action (Screamin' '91 Remix)" and "Home Sweet Home '91 Remix"), a soundtrack contribution ("Rock 'n' Roll Junkie"), a compilation album track "Teaser" (previously released on the Stairway to Heaven/Highway to Hell album), a previously unreleased live version ("Kickstart My Heart (Live in Dallas, Texas)") and three newly recorded songs "Primal Scream", "Angela" and "Anarchy in the U.K.".

The album debuted at No. 2 in the US albums chart, just under Garth Brooks Ropin' The Wind, and was certified double platinum by the RIAA.

Music videos were made for three of the singles to promote the album. "Primal Scream", "Home Sweet Home '91", and "Anarchy in the U.K." which was largely shot on the bands Monsters of Rock tour in Europe. "Angela" was also released as a single.

The remix version of "Home Sweet Home" was the band's 8th and final Top 40 hit in 1991, reaching No. 37 on the Billboard Hot 100. The original 1985 version had only reached No. 89 on the same chart.

"Rock n' Roll Junkie" had been featured in the Andrew Dice Clay movie, The Adventures of Ford Fairlane, which featured a cameo by Vince Neil.

The songs, "Smokin' in the Boys Room", "Teaser" and "Anarchy in the U.K." are all cover songs, originally recorded by Brownsville Station, Tommy Bolin, and Sex Pistols respectively. During an MTV interview in 1991, Tommy Lee stated that Vince Neil recorded his vocals for "Anarchy in the U.K." in one take. Neil has stated that John Lydon called him saying the cover was brilliant.

Reissue
The album was succeeded by Greatest Hits in 1998 and Red, White & Crüe in 2005. The songs, "Teaser", "Rock 'n' Roll Junkie", "Primal Scream", "Angela", and "Anarchy in the U.K." were reissued on the Supersonic and Demonic Relics compilation in 1999, and the remixes of "Live Wire", "Piece of Your Action", "Home Sweet Home" and the live version of "Kickstart My Heart" were reissued on the Music to Crash Your Car To: Vol. 2 box set.

Track listing

Video album
Decade of Decadence was also released as a video album on VHS on March 24, 1992. The video features new interviews and the band's full catalog of music videos, which were in part previously released on the video albums Uncensored and Dr. Feelgood The Videos. It includes new live clips, music videos from the album Girls, Girls, Girls and the new music videos "Primal Scream", "Home Sweet Home '91", and "Anarchy in the U.K.". The interview segments were directed and produced by Brian Lockwood.

Track listing
 "Live Wire" 
 "Piece Of Your Action"
 "Shout At The Devil"
 "Looks That Kill"
 "Home Sweet Home '91"
 "Smokin' in the Boys Room"
 "Girls, Girls, Girls" (uncensored version)
 "Wild Side"
 "Dr. Feelgood" (UK edit version) 
 "Kickstart My Heart (Live)"
 "Teaser"
 "Rock 'N' Roll Junkie"
 "Primal Scream"
 "Angela"
 "Anarchy in the U.K."

Charts

Album

Singles

Certifications

Album

Video

References

External links
 Official Website

Mötley Crüe compilation albums
1991 greatest hits albums
Elektra Records compilation albums
1992 video albums
Elektra Records video albums